Galar is a town and municipality located in the province and autonomous community of Navarre, Northern Spain.

References

External links
 GALAR in the Bernardo Estornés Lasa - Auñamendi Encyclopedia (Euskomedia Fundazioa) 

	

Municipalities in Navarre